Hla Moe (born on August 28, 1968) is a Burmese politician currently serving as a House of Representatives MP for Aungmyethazan Township. He is a member of the National League for Democracy.

Early life and education 
Hla Moe was born in Mandalay, Myanmar on August 28, 1968. In 1987–1997, he graduated with BSc, MSc and also PhD from Mandalay University in 2005. He also studied in Ph D, Sandwich Program, Philipps University, Germany. He would be a University teacher and writer.

Political career
He is a member of the National League for Democracy. In the 2015 Myanmar general election, he contested the Aungmyethazan Township constituency for a seat in the Pyithu Hluttaw , the country's lower house, winning a majority of 87375 votes.

References

1968 births
Living people
University of Marburg alumni
Members of Pyithu Hluttaw
National League for Democracy politicians
People from Mandalay
Mandalay University alumni